Pisnia zavzhdy z namy is a 1975 Ukrainian musical film, produced by Viktor Storozhenko starring Sofia Rotaru in the main role, as well as Ukrainian Smerichka vocal-instrumental band. The movie features songs in Ukrainian, Romanian and Russian of Sofia Rotaru filmed in the background of Ukrainian Carpathian mountains.

Plot 
Filmed by Ukrainian studio of television films, the musical film Pisnia zavzhdy z namy features six songs of Volodymyr Ivasiuk, written for Sofia Rotaru. The young and beautiful singer starts a concert in a mountainous vacation resort music club in open air. This autobiographical scenario depicts true Ukrainian Moldavian origins of Sofia Rotaru in the bucolic atmosphere of melodic Northern Bukovina in Western Ukraine.

Production
The filming took place in the village Ploska in Putyla Raion. The main theme of the movie is the exploration of the artistic laboratory of Sofia Rotaru, who has always affirmed that her artistic path started from a stage in a village club.

Soundtrack

Notes

External links
Filmography of Sofia Riotaru

1975 films
1975 in the Soviet Union
1970s musical films
Ukrainian-language films
Soviet-era Ukrainian films
Films set in Ukraine
Soviet musical films
Ukrainian musical films